The tennis tournaments at the 2012 Summer Olympics in London were staged at the All England Club in Wimbledon, from 28 July to 5 August. This was the first Olympic grass court tournament since tennis was reintroduced as an Olympic sport and the first to be held at a Grand Slam venue in the Open era. Two other 2012 Summer Olympic bid finalists had also offered Grand Slam venues. Second-place finisher Paris offered the French Open venue, the Stade Roland Garros, which later was also included in their successful 2024 bid. Meanwhile, fourth-place finisher New York City offered the US Open venue, the USTA Billie Jean King National Tennis Center in Flushing Meadows-Corona Park, Queens.

A total of 190 players competed in five events: singles and doubles for both men and women and, for the first time since 1924, mixed doubles were officially included. The Olympic tennis events were run and organised by the London Organising Committee of the Olympic Games (LOCOG) and the International Tennis Federation (ITF), and were part of the Association of Tennis Professionals (ATP) and Women's Tennis Association (WTA) tours. As a side effect, the regular rule imposed by the All England Club during The Championships calling for all-white player clothing was waived to allow players to wear Olympic national team clothing, and London 2012 bunting also mixed with the traditional Wimbledon green.

Elena Dementieva and Rafael Nadal were the reigning champions, neither of whom defended their titles. Dementieva had retired from professional tennis in 2010, while Nadal withdrew due to tendinitis.

Summary
In the women's singles tournament, Serena Williams defeated Maria Sharapova while losing only one game in the final for the gold medal and her sixth major event win at Wimbledon, having won the ladies' singles tournament at The Championships less than three weeks earlier as well as in 2002, 2003, 2009 and 2010. She also defended her women's doubles title alongside her sister Venus Williams, who had won singles gold in Sydney in 2000. With her singles gold, she became the second female player to win a career singles Golden Slam—Olympic gold in addition to the Australian Open, the French Open, Wimbledon and the US Open, with the first being Steffi Graf in 1988 after she won all five events that year (a feat not yet matched by another player, male or female.)  Williams also became the first player in history, male or female, to win the career Golden Grand Slam in both singles and doubles (the Williams sisters had already completed their career doubles Golden Grand Slam at the 2001 Australian Open, joining Pam Shriver in Seoul in 1988 and Gigi Fernández at the 1993 Australian Open.) Furthermore, the Williams sisters also became the first four-time gold medalists in Olympic tennis history.

In the men's singles tournament final, Andy Murray beat Roger Federer in straight sets in front of a home crowd to avenge his four-set loss against Federer exactly four weeks earlier on Centre Court in the finals at Wimbledon. In doing so, he denied Federer the chance to become the third man to win a career singles Golden Grand Slam after Nadal at the 2010 US Open and Andre Agassi at the 1999 French Open. He also became the first British man to win singles tennis gold since Josiah Ritchie in 1908 (also at Wimbledon) and the first to win a major event at Wimbledon since Fred Perry won The Championships in 1936. Based on his gold medal as well as his achievements over the following four years, including a US Open championship, two Wimbledon championships and a Davis Cup, Team GB chose him as their flagbearer for the opening ceremony in Rio de Janeiro in 2016, where he won a second consecutive gold medal.

Meanwhile, the Bryan brothers (Mike and Bob) took the men's doubles gold for the United States and themselves completed a career Golden Grand Slam, joining the Australian "Woodies" (Todd Woodbridge and Mark Woodforde, who completed their set at the 2000 French Open) and Canada's Daniel Nestor at Wimbledon in 2009. Also, the Belorussian top seeds of Victoria Azarenka and Max Mirnyi took the mixed doubles gold after overcoming Murray and Laura Robson mere hours after Murray had defeated Federer.

Tournament
 The 2012 Olympic tournament was the fourteenth edition of tennis at the Olympics (excluding the two Olympics, 1968 and 1984, when tennis was a demonstration event), and the seventh since 1988, when tennis was officially brought back into the Olympic Games. Mixed doubles was an official Olympic event for the first time since 1924, when Hazel Wightman and Richard Williams of the United States won the gold medal, and was played for the first time since it was played as a demonstration event in 1968. 
The 2012 tournaments were played on grass courts at the All England Club, three weeks after the end of the 2012 edition of The Championships. Sessions ran from 11 a.m. until 10 p.m. as established by the All England Club policy. However, the All England Club along with other organizers not only allowed but encouraged the players to wear their national colours as opposed to predominantly white clothes in accordance with typical Wimbledon tradition, and the normally all-green grounds were also decked out in purple and multi-coloured London 2012 Olympic branding.

Twelve courts were used for the matches including Centre Court, No.1 and No.2. No.3 Court was used for warm ups. The Olympic tennis events were organised jointly by the ITF, the IOC and the All England Club. Both the men's and women's singles and doubles events counted as a part of the 2012 ATP World Tour and the 2012 WTA Tour.

Points distribution
The points distribution for the Association of Tennis Professionals and the Women's Tennis Association tours, concerning only singles competition on the 2012 Olympic Games, is listed below. These points can be added to a player's world ranking for the 2012 season.

Qualification

For the singles competitions, the top 56 players in the world rankings on 11 June 2012 of the WTA and ATP tours qualified for the Olympics. However, entry was limited to four players from a country.  This means that players who were ranked in the top 56 but are from countries with four higher-ranked players already participating did not qualify, and players who were ranked outside of the top 56 but are from countries with fewer than four players already participating qualified. A player could only participate if he or she had made him- or herself available to be drafted to represent the player's country in Davis Cup or Fed Cup for two of the following years:  2009, 2010, 2011, 2012, with one of the years being either 2011 or 2012. Of the other eight wildcard slots, six of the slots were determined by the ITF's Olympic Committee, taking into account ranking and spread of nations represented, while the final two slots were awarded by the IOC to players from small nations.

In the doubles competitions, twenty four teams automatically qualified as per the rankings on 11 June 2012, subject to a maximum of two teams per nation. Players in the top ten of the doubles rankings could reserve a place, provided they had a partner to compete with. The remaining eight teams were decided by the ITF's Olympic Committee. Entries for the mixed doubles were confirmed at the Games. The Tripartite Commission later decided only to give places in the women's singles leaving eight wildcards to be chosen by the 
ITF Olympic Committee for the men's singles competition.

Competition of Olympics

Format
The tennis competition at the Olympic Games consists of a single elimination tournament. The size of the singles draw, 64, means that there are six rounds of competition in total, with five in the doubles owing to its smaller draw size of 32, and 4 for mixed with its draw size only being 16. Players reaching the semifinal are assured of an opportunity to compete for a medal, as the two losing parties in each semifinals contest a bronze medal match.

In a further change from normal Wimbledon practice, the matches followed the Olympic format – all matches were three-set matches except for the men's singles final, which would be a five-set match. The tie break operated in every set except the fifth set in the men's singles final and the third set in the other matches (except mixed doubles), when an advantage set was played. In the mixed doubles the third set was played as a match tie-break (10 points).

Calendar

Medal summary

Medal table

Medal events

Wild card entries

Men's singles wild card entries
The following players received an ITF Invitation:

Women's singles wild card entries
The following players received an ITF Invitation:

 
 
 
 
 
 

The following players received a Tripartite Commission Invitation:

Men's doubles wild card entries
The following players received an ITF Invitation:

Women's doubles wild card entries
The following players received an ITF Invitation:

Mixed doubles wild card entries
The following players received an ITF Invitation:

Singles seeds
Seedings were based on the rankings as of 23 July 2012.

Men's singles

Withdrawn players

Women's singles

Withdrawn players

References

External links

 
 
 

 
2012 Summer Olympics events
Olympics
2012 Olympics
2012
Olympics,2012
Olympics